Gilfedder is a surname. Notable people with the surname include:

Laurie Gilfedder (1935–2019), British rugby union and rugby league footballer
Michael Gilfedder (1866–1948), New Zealand politician